Ku Wai Ming (born 11 September 1973) is a Hong Kong sprinter. Graduated from St. Paul’s College. He competed in the men's 100 metres at the 1992 Summer Olympics.

References

External links
 

1973 births
Living people
Athletes (track and field) at the 1992 Summer Olympics
Hong Kong male sprinters
Olympic athletes of Hong Kong
Place of birth missing (living people)